Rainbow are an English-American hard rock band originally from Hertford, Hertfordshire. Formed in January 1975 by then-Deep Purple guitarist Ritchie Blackmore, the original lineup of the group also included former Elf members Ronnie James Dio (lead vocals), Craig Gruber (bass), Gary Driscoll (drums) and Micky Lee Soule (keyboards), who recorded and released the self-titled album Ritchie Blackmore's Rainbow that year. After leaving Deep Purple, Blackmore replaced Gruber, Driscoll and Soule in September with Jimmy Bain, Cozy Powell and Tony Carey, respectively. Rising and live album On Stage were recorded with this second lineup, before Bain and Carey were sacked by Blackmore in 3 January 1977. Long Live Rock 'n' Roll, released in 1978, featured bassist Bob Daisley and keyboardist David Stone, in addition to Powell.

After the release of Long Live Rock 'n' Roll, Dio left due to disagreements with Blackmore. Graham Bonnet replaced Dio for 1979's Down to Earth, which also saw the addition of bassist Roger Glover and keyboardist Don Airey. Bonnet left after the album's release and was replaced by Joe Lynn Turner, while Powell also left the group to be replaced by Bobby Rondinelli; both new members performed on Difficult to Cure. Keyboardist David Rosenthal replaced Airey for 1982's Straight Between the Eyes and 1983's Bent Out of Shape, the latter of which featured drummer Chuck Burgi who replaced Rondinelli. Rainbow broke up for the first time in 1984.

After Blackmore left Deep Purple for the second time in 1993, Rainbow reformed with vocalist Doogie White, bassist Greg Smith, drummer John O'Reilly and keyboardist Paul Morris, releasing the album Stranger in Us All in 1995. The band's return was short-lived, however, as they broke up again in 1997 when Blackmore shifted focus to Blackmore's Night. In November 2015, it was revealed that Blackmore would be returning to the Rainbow moniker for a number of shows in 2016 with vocalist Ronnie Romero, bassist Bob Nouveau (Bob Curiano), drummer David Keith and keyboardist Jens Johansson. The group has since released three new live albums and a number of singles.

Members

Current

Former

Touring

Timeline

Recording Timeline

Lineups

References

External links
Ritchie Blackmore official website

Rainbow